Kevin Whitesides (born May 1, 1964) is an American race car driver who competed in the Formula Super Vee and attempted rookie orientation for the 1989 Indianapolis 500.  In the 1985 Super Vee season, Kevin finished 23rd in points, with a high finish of 5th at Indianapolis Raceway Park.

Racing record

SCCA National Championship Runoffs

References 
 
 
 

Living people
1964 births
Sportspeople from Columbia, Missouri
Racing drivers from Missouri
SCCA National Championship Runoffs winners